State Road 238 (SR 238) is a state highway in Union and Columbia counties in Florida. The entire route of SR 238 is only 2 lanes wide. Oddly, it slightly heads north–south on its way to Lake Butler.

Route description
Starting at US 41-441 near Interstate 75 as Yukon Street, it is in Columbia County for 1 and a half miles. Next, it crosses a bridge over the Olustee Creek, one of the rivers in the Suwannee River basin and enters Union County. It first intersects County Road 245, then County Road 241, then County Road 791, and finally County Road 239. The road becomes Southwest Second Street upon entering the city limits and county seat, of Lake Butler, then turns north at the intersection with State Road 231 at Southwest Sixth Avenue. SW 2nd Street continues as a city street for two more blocks to Southwest Fourth Avenue. It travels north  to State Road 100, then the road ends. It becomes County Road 238 after State Road 100.

Major intersections

County Road 238

It is accessible to Lake Butler from the north. There are no main junctions on this route.

References

238
238
238
238